HMS Cawsand Bay was a  anti-aircraft frigate of the British Royal Navy, named for Cawsand Bay in Cornwall.

The ship was originally ordered from the Blyth Shipbuilding Company of Blyth, Northumberland on 25 January 1943 as the  Loch Rowan, and laid down on 24 April 1944. However the contract was then changed, and the ship was completed to a revised design as a Bay-class anti-aircraft frigate, launched on 26 February 1945, and completed on 13 November 1945.

Service history
After sea trials in November and December 1945, Cawsand Bay was attached for service in the Rosyth Local Flotilla, joining in February 1946. However she was almost immediately nominated for reduction to Reserve status, sailing to Portsmouth to decommission on 11 March.

Cawsand Bay remained in Reserve at Portsmouth until 1958 when she placed on the Disposal List. The ship was sold for demolition to an Italian ship-breaker and towed to Genoa, arriving on 5 September 1959.

References

Publications

 

1945 ships
Bay-class frigates
Ships built on the River Blyth